The Hidden Pearl: The Syrian Orthodox Church And Its Ancient Aramaic Heritage is a 2001 documentary published by TransWorld Film Italia commissioned by the Syriac Orthodox Church. The documentary was published in the form of three videos together with three printed volumes.

Volume 1, The Ancient Aramaic Heritage, deals with the Syriac-Aramean heritage as the cradle of civilization. It covers the pre-Christian Old Aramaic period, covering the Aramaean city states, the Neo-Assyrian, Achaemenid and Seleucid periods, including the kingdoms of Palmyra, Petra, Edessa and Hatra.
Volume 2, The Heirs of the Ancient Aramaic Heritage, addresses Middle Aramaic tradition and literature, the Aramaic of Jesus and classical Syriac literature.
Volume 3, At the Turn of the Third Millennium: the Syrian Orthodox Witness, focuses on and describes the current situation of the Syriac people, the Syriac Orthodox Church and its history in Tur Abdin, the Syriac genocide, Seyfo, and the Syriac diaspora.

See also
Syriac

References

External links
 
Official site
Youtube video from SuyoyoSat Germany

2001 films
Documentary films about religion
Sponsored films
Documentary films about Christianity
Films about Assyrians